Parth Jhala (born 28 October 1989) is an Indian former cricketer. He played two first-class matches for Hyderabad between 2012 and 2013.

See also
 List of Hyderabad cricketers

References

External links
 

1989 births
Living people
Indian cricketers
Hyderabad cricketers
People from Vadodara